Supersleuth is a 1984 Australian television film directed by David Wilson and starring Carmen Duncan, Steven Grives, David Petty, Jason Fanelli, Patrick Ward, and John Ewart. The screenplay concerns a group of people gathered in a secluded house murdered by a mysterious killer.

References

External links

Australian television films
1984 television films
1984 films
1980s English-language films